Randolph is the primary village and a census-designated place (CDP) in the town of Randolph, Orange County, Vermont, United States. As of the 2020 census, it had a population of 2,083, out of 4,774 in the entire town of Randolph.

The CDP is in southwestern Orange County, in the southwest corner of the town of Randolph. It is bordered to the east by the Third Branch of the White River and its tributary Ayers Brook, all part of the Connecticut River watershed.

Vermont Route 12 passes through the center of the village as its Main Street, leading north through Brookfield Gulf  to Northfield and south  to Bethel. Vermont Route 12A departs Route 12 in Randolph and leads northwest, then north and northeast  to Northfield.

The New England Central Railroad passes through the village, with Amtrak passenger service available from Randolph station in the village center.

References 

Populated places in Orange County, Vermont
Census-designated places in Orange County, Vermont
Census-designated places in Vermont